Tadeusz Breyer (15 October 1874 in Mielec – 15 May 1952 in Warsaw) - Polish sculptor and medallic artist. He studied at the School of Fine Arts in Kraków. Then, he left for the Academy in Florence. In 1904 he moved to Warsaw. From 1910 to 1952, except for the periods of the world wars, he taught at the Academy of Fine Arts. While he worked at the Academy he educated many Polish sculptors, e.g.: Alfons Karny, Józef Gosławski,  and Franciszek Strynkiewicz. Most of his works were destroyed during the Second World War. The most famous of his sculptures is the monument of General Józef Sowiński, which is located in Warsaw.

Bibliography

External links 

 

Modern sculptors
1874 births
1952 deaths
Academic staff of the Academy of Fine Arts in Warsaw
20th-century Polish sculptors
Polish male sculptors
20th-century male artists